Leonid Aleksandrovich Komarov (born 23 January 1987) is a professional ice hockey centre for Luleå HF of the Swedish Hockey League (SHL). Born to an ethnic Russian–Finnish family, and raised in Finland, Komarov plays for Finland internationally. A natural centre early in his career, Komarov has made the transition to being able to play all three forward positions.

Although Komarov was raised in Finland, he is reportedly the first ever NHL player who was born in Estonia. Komarov was a member of the gold medal-winning Finnish national teams in the 2011 IIHF World Championship and 2022 Winter Olympics.

Playing career
After playing with different junior teams, Komarov began his professional career in the Finnish SM-liiga with Ässät. After winning a silver medal with Ässät in 2006, he moved to Pelicans. After his season with Ässät, he was chosen in the sixth round of the 2006 NHL Entry Draft, 180th overall, by the Toronto Maple Leafs.

Komarov captained Finland at the 2007 World Junior Ice Hockey Championships in Leksand and Mora, Sweden.

During the 2009–10 season, Komarov played with Dynamo Moscow of the Kontinental Hockey League (KHL).

Komarov won a gold medal with Finland at the 2011 IIHF World Championships in Bratislava and Košice, Slovakia.

In May 2012, Komarov agreed to a contract with the Toronto Maple Leafs for the 2012–13 season. The reported value of his contract was $1.2 million, including bonuses. He played his first career NHL game on 19 January 2013, and he scored his first NHL goal (a game winner) against the Montreal Canadiens on 9 February 2013.

After one season with the Maple Leafs, Komarov left the NHL to sign a one-year contract to return with Dynamo Moscow in June 2013, with the ambition to make the Finnish 2014 Winter Olympic squad in a more offensive role with Dynamo; he made the roster, also serving as an alternate captain.

Despite signing with Dynamo Moscow, Komarov said he was not done with the NHL, and one year later, on 1 July 2014, he signed a four-year deal worth $2.9 million per season to return to the Maple Leafs. Komarov played well following the signing, recording 4 goals and 16 assists in his first 23 games of the season, as well as 99 hits, enough for third in the NHL as of late November. However, a blindside hit from former Dynamo Moscow linemate Alexander Ovechkin on 29 November left Komarov with concussion issues, and he would score at a lackluster pace for the rest of the season.

Komarov would rebound the next season and excel under new head coach Mike Babcock. Komarov, who previously played on Toronto's second, third lines and fourth lines, was now experiencing top line duties (taking Phil Kessel's spot), and occasionally reprising his role on the second. He led the Maple Leafs in goals and points up to the Christmas break. Shortly after, he was named to the 2016 NHL All-Star Game on 6 January 2016. Komarov had 27 points in 37 games when named an All-Star, including 15 goals, and was one point behind teammate James van Riemsdyk for the team lead in scoring. Given Komarov's reputation and traditional NHL role as a bottom six grinder, he had not expected to be named an All Star, going as far as to book a vacation during the All-Star break, which was cancelled after he had been named to the festivities. Komarov's production declined in the latter half of the season, partially due to the loss of van Riemsdyk in January to injury. Despite this, Komarov finished the year third in team scoring with 36 points, behind only P. A. Parenteau and Nazem Kadri. The following season, he shared a line with Kadri and rookie winger Connor Brown. In 2017, Komarov played in the NHL Centennial Classic where he scored one goal in Toronto's 5–4 overtime win against the Detroit Red Wings. In 2018, Komarov played in the 2018 NHL Stadium Series against the Washington Capitals, where the Leafs lost 2–5.

On 1 July 2018, Komarov signed a four-year, $3 million per year contract with the New York Islanders. After playing one NHL game at the start of the 2021–22 NHL season, Komarov was assigned to the Islanders' American Hockey League (AHL) affiliate, the Bridgeport Islanders, when he cleared waivers. On 15 November 2021, Komarov signed a two-year contract with SKA Saint Petersburg of the Kontinental Hockey League (KHL). On 4 September 2022, Komarov signed a one-year contract with Luleå HF of the Swedish Hockey League (SHL).

Personal life
Komarov was born in Narva, in Estonian SSR, Soviet Union to Russian-speaking parents. When he was five years old, Komarov's family moved to the Swedish-speaking town of Nykarleby, Finland, when his father Alexander Komarov accepted a contract to play ice hockey there. Because of his father's partial (Ingrian) Finnish descent, the family was eligible for Finnish citizenship and thus able to permanently reside there. Leo Komarov also holds dual Russian and Finnish citizenship and reportedly can speak four languages (Russian, Swedish, Finnish, and English).

Komarov is married to Juulia Manner. The pair tied the knot on 2 July 2016 in Helsinki, after dating for ten years. They have two children.

Career statistics

Regular season and playoffs

International

All-Star Game

Awards and honours
 SM-Liiga, Runners-up – 2005–06
 Karjala Tournament, Winner – 2013
 Channel One Cup, Winner – 2009
 Sweden Hockey Games, Winner – 2010, 2014
 Euro Hockey Tour, Winner – 2009–10
 2011 – Medal "For military cooperation"
 IIHF World Champion – 2011
 IIHF World Championship, Runners-up – 2014, 2016
 KHL All-Star Game – 2011, 2014 participant
 KHL, Gagarin Cup – 2011–12, 2012–13
 2013 – First Estonian born NHL player
 2016 – NHL All-Star Game participant

References

External links

 

1987 births
Living people
Ässät players
Finnish expatriate ice hockey players in Canada
Finnish ice hockey centres
Finnish Karelian people
Finnish people of Russian descent
HC Dynamo Moscow players
Ice hockey players at the 2014 Winter Olympics
Ice hockey players at the 2022 Winter Olympics
Lahti Pelicans players
Luleå HF players
Medalists at the 2014 Winter Olympics
Medalists at the 2022 Winter Olympics
National Hockey League All-Stars
Naturalized citizens of Finland
New York Islanders players
Olympic bronze medalists for Finland
Olympic gold medalists for Finland
Olympic ice hockey players of Finland
Olympic medalists in ice hockey
People from Nykarleby
People of Ingrian Finnish descent
Russian emigrants to Finland
Soviet emigrants to Finland 
Russian Karelian people
SKA Saint Petersburg players
Sportspeople from Narva
Swedish-speaking Finns
Toronto Maple Leafs draft picks
Toronto Maple Leafs players
Toronto Marlies players